Armand Sylvestre may refer to:
 Armand Sylvestre (MLA) (1910–1980), Quebec lawyer, judge and member of the Quebec legislative assembly representing Berthier
 Armand Sylvestre (MP) (1890–1972), Quebec lawyer and member of the Canadian House of Commons representing Lake St. John
 Paul Armand Silvestre, French poet, author of the libretto for the opera Grisélidis by Jules Massenet